Lindsay Gordon Scott ARAIA (1898 – 4 January 1941) was a prominent Sydney architect best associated for his design of the Erskineville Town Hall and numerous surf pavilions in New South Wales, including several on the Northern Beaches of Sydney.

Early life
Scott was born to John and Isabella Scott in 1898 in the town of Grafton, in the Northern Rivers region of New South Wales, and moved with his family to Sydney in 1901 at a young age. Scott received his architecture diploma from the School of Architecture at the Sydney Technical College.

Architectural practice

In 1923, Scott joined the prominent Sydney architectural firm of Robertson and Marks as an assistant, and from 1925 was working within another prominent firm, Ross and Rowe. In 1925 he was admitted as a member of the New South Wales Institute of Architects. While at Ross and Rowe, in 1926–1930 Scott was involved in the redesign project for the Mark Foy's Piazza Department Store.

In 1934, Scott left Ross & Rowe and established his own private practice, operating at 350 George Street (to 1936) and 26 O'Connell Street (from 1936) in Sydney. In private practice Scott continue to design all manner of works including residential dwellings and commercial and industrial premises. His design for an Inter-war Old English style residence overlooking Collaroy Beach featured in prominent architectural magazine, Building, in 1937.

A resident of the Northern Beaches of Sydney for many years, Scott was intimately involved in Surf Life Saving, being captain of the Freshwater Surf Life Saving Club in 1924–26, as well as an executive, vice-president, and later Honorary Architect of the Surf Life Saving Association. As Honorary Architect, Scott designed several Surf Life Saving clubs and surf pavilions, including at Freshwater Beach (1935), Coffs Harbour Jetty (1935), South Curl Curl (1937), Palm Beach (1937), and Queenscliff (1938).

In late 1936 Scott was commissioned by the Municipality of Erskineville to design a new Town Hall for the small inner city council. Scott's initial design in the Mediterranean style was an ambitious one, including two stories and a 75-foot-high clock tower. This design however was found to be too expensive and grand for a small municipality in a primarily working-class area of Sydney and was later revised to be a scaled down single-storey building without the tower in a similar red brick Mediterranean style. Completed in 1938, the Town Hall was also featured in Building. In 1939 Scott designed the Christ Church in Coonabarabran for the Anglican Diocese of Bathurst.

Apart from surf life saving, Scott was active elsewhere in the community as a member of the Cromer Country Golf Club, president of the Manly Chamber of Commerce, member of the Manly Rotary Club, and at one time Master of the Masonic Lodge, Annandale.

On 4 January 1941 at the age of 42, Scott "died suddenly" at his residence at 26 Fairlight Street, Manly. Survived by his wife Audrey and son John, Scott's funeral was held at St Andrew's Presbyterian Church, Manly, before his body was cremated at Northern Suburbs Crematorium. In a final tribute to his long contribution to the surf life saving community, a team comprising the Freshwater, Queenscliff, and South Curl Curl surf life saving crews scattered his ashes off Freshwater beach on 8 June 1941.

List of works (incomplete)
Masonic Lodge, 19 Marlborough Street, Leichhardt (1925).
Residence, Mosman (1927).
Harbord Literary Institute (Front extension), 31 Lawrence Street, Freshwater (1935).
Residence, Collaroy (1935).
Bakery, shop and dwelling, Albert Street, Freshwater (1936).
South Curl Curl Surf Club (1936).
Residence, Rickard Avenue, Mosman (1936).
Dwelling, Haig Street, Maroubra (1936).
Palm Beach Surf Pavilion (now renamed Lieutenant Colonel Douglas Marks DSO, MC Pavilion), 1 Ocean Road, Palm Beach (1937).
Factory premises, Parramatta Road, Auburn (1937).
Residence, Strathfield (1937).
Erskineville Town Hall, 104 Erskineville Road, Erskineville (1938).
Queenscliff Surf Pavilion, Manly (1938).
Christ Church, 94 Dalgarno Street, Coonabarabran (1939).
Manly Bowling Club pavilion, Ivanhoe Park (1940).

References

New South Wales architects
20th-century Australian architects
Mediterranean Revival architects
People from Grafton, New South Wales
Australian surf lifesavers
Australian Freemasons
1898 births
1941 deaths